The Pueblo City Park Carousel is a historic carousel in Pueblo, Colorado, United States.  Built in 1911, it is a Parker #72 /Stein & Goldstein carousel.  Its horses are believed to have been carved circa 1907.  In 1983, it was listed on the National Register of Historic Places, and it is currently owned by Pueblo City Park.

References

Amusement rides introduced in 1911
Carousels on the National Register of Historic Places in Colorado
Tourist attractions in Pueblo, Colorado
1911 establishments in Colorado
National Register of Historic Places in Pueblo, Colorado